Peter Campbell (born January 31, 1983) is a Canadian professional golfer.

Campbell played collegiate golf at Southern Wesleyan University, turning professional in 2007.  

In July 2018, Campbell won the Beijing Championship on the 2018 PGA Tour China by a stroke from Zhang Huilin.

Professional wins (1)

PGA Tour China wins (1)

References

External links

Canadian male golfers
Left-handed golfers
Southern Wesleyan University alumni
People from Baddeck, Nova Scotia
1983 births
Living people